José Legrá (born 19 April 1943) is a retired professional featherweight boxer. He is a former two time WBC World Featherweight Champion.

Professional career
In June 1960, Legrá turned professional in Cuba winning his first fight against Pedro Pinera which he won with a points decision over four rounds. Legrá drew his next fight and lost two after that and fought a total of 34 fights in Mexico and Cuba before departing for Spain in 1963 with a record of 27–5–2.

Move to Spain
His first fight in Spain was in October 1963 against Moroccan Lazaro ben Layachi, which he won by KO in the sixth of eight rounds. Legrá then went on a run of over sixty wins between 1963 and 1967 with just one defeat on points against Welshman Howard Winstone at the Winter Gardens, Blackpool in England.

European title
Legrá won his first title belt, the vacant European Featherweight title, in December 1967 with a third-round knockout win over France's Yves Desmarets. Legrá  subsequently relinquished the title without a defence.

WBC World title
Legrá first opportunity to fight for a recognised world title belt came in July 1968 when he challenged Howard Winstone again, this time for his WBC Featherweight title. Legrá floored Winstone twice in the first round of the fight. The bout was subsequently halted because Winstone had a badly swollen left eye.

Legra lost his WBC featherweight title on 21 January 1969 after being defeated by French-Australian Johnny Famechon on points at the Albert Hall in London.

After Famechon
Legrá won two matches before losing by UD to Vicente Saldivar. Seven matches later Legrá would regain the EBU Featherweight title after beating Tommaso Galli on points. Legra would defend it five times before vacating it in 1972.

Regaining the WBC title and retirement
On 16 December 1972. Legrá fought Clemente Sanchez for the vacant Featherweight title, Sanchez was stripped of the title before the fight but the title was still on the line for Legrá. Legrá would TKO Sanchez in the tenth round to win.

Legrá lost the title in his very next fight to Brazilian Éder Jofre by Majority Decision. He would fight 3 matches after that, beating Jimmy Bell by points, losing to Alexis Arguello by KO and beating Daniel Valdez by points.

On April 25, 2020, it was announced that Legra, aged 77, was battling the coronavirus.

Professional boxing record

See also
 Lineal championship
 List of WBC world champions

References

 

|-

|-

|-

1943 births
Living people
Cuban male boxers
Cuban emigrants to Spain
European Boxing Union champions
World Boxing Council champions
Spanish male boxers
Featherweight boxers
People from Baracoa